The 1965 Inter-Cities Fairs Cup Final was the final of the seventh Inter-Cities Fairs Cup and the second of two that were not played over two legs. It was played on 23 June 1965 between Ferencváros of Hungary and Juventus of Italy. Ferencváros won the tie 1–0. Juve, with a lower physical level than their Hungarian opponents as a result of the demanding season in Serie A, played the match without two of its best players, Sivori and Salvadore.

Route to the final

Match details

|
|valign="top" width="50%"|

|}

See also
1964–65 Inter-Cities Fairs Cup
Ferencvárosi TC in European football
Juventus F.C. in European football

References

External links
RSSSF

2
Inter-Cities Fairs Cup Final 1965
Inter-Cities Fairs Cup Final 1965
Inter-Cities Fairs Cup Final 1965
Inter-Cities Fairs Cup Final 1965
1965
Inter-Cities Fairs Cup Final
Inter-Cities Fairs Cup Final
Sports competitions in Turin
1960s in Turin
June 1965 sports events in Europe